The Small Press and Alternative Comics Expo, or SPACE or S.P.A.C.E., is an annual convention in Columbus, Ohio, United States, for alternative comics, minicomics, and webcomics. Bob Corby founded the convention as a gathering place for "the comics and the creators with no distractions." The show is sponsored by Corby's Back Porch Comics, a Columbus small press comics publisher.

Like most comic book conventions, in addition to exhibitor tables, each show features art exhibits, panel discussions, and workshops.

History 
Prior to SPACE, there had been a few small press-themed conventions in Columbus, including segments of the Mid-Ohio Con (dating from the 1980s) and a stop on Dave Sim's 1995 "Spirits of Independents" tour. In 2000, inspired by Spirits of Independence, and with Sim's blessing, Columbus small press comics publisher Bob Corby staged the first SPACE show at the Rhodes Center in the Ohio Expo Center. 49 small press exhibitors — including Matt Feazell, Carla Speed McNeil, Alex Robinson, and William Messner-Loebs — came from as far as Illinois, North Carolina, and Connecticut.

In 2001, Sim collaborated directly with Corby, and SPACE became the home of the inaugural Day Prize, administered in person by Sim. 65 exhibitors came from as far west as Portland, Oregon, and as far east as New York City. Columbus-based Jeff Smith made a surprise appearance.

From 2001 to 2008, Sim was a special guest at every SPACE show, often with his long-time collaborator Gerhard. In 2004, Sim was awarded the SPACE Lifetime Achievement Award.

In 2007, with SPACE growing in popularity and exhibitors, the show expanded to two days and moved to the Aladdin Shrine Center. The 2008 show, Sim's last appearance, featured 30 of his original drawings, and over 150 creators and publishers. The 2009 show featured an exhibit of original pages from Carol Tyler's new graphic novel, You’ll Never Know, Book One: A Good and Decent Man.

In 2010, the show expanded once again, moving to the Ramada Plaza Hotel & Conference Center. The 2012 show featured creators like Nate Powell, Carol Tyler, John Porcellino, Tom Scioli, and Eric Adams.

The 2020 show, scheduled for July 11–12, was cancelled due to the COVID-19 pandemic.

Dates and locations

The Day Prize / the SPACE Prize 
In 2001, Dave Sim and his collaborator Gerhard founded the Howard E. Day Prize for outstanding achievement in self-publishing, in tribute to Sim's mentor, Gene Day. Bestowed annually at SPACE from 2002 to 2008 the prize consisted of a $500 cash award and a commemorative plaque. The recipient was chosen by Sim and Gerhard from a pool of submitted works.

In 2008, Sim announced he was withdrawing from convention appearances (including SPACE) to concentrate on new work. In addition, Sim announced that, beginning in 2009, the Day Prize was going to be folded into the Joe Shuster Canadian Comic Book Creator Awards. SPACE organizer Bob Corby announced the creation of the SPACE Prize beginning at the 2008 show. Entries for the SPACE Prize are submitted by that year's exhibitors, with a list of finalists selected by Corby. The winner is chosen by a group of judges and SPACE exhibitors.

In 2009, the SPACE Prize expanded to include three categories, General, Minicomic/Short story, and Webcomic. In 2013 the SPACE Prize added the Graphic Novel category. In 2016 the SPACE Prize dropped the Webcomic category but added the Junior Category prize.

Day Prize/SPACE Prize Winners 
 2001: Faith: A Fable, by Bill Knapp
 2002: Misa, by Tom Williams
 2003: Askari Hodari #3, by Glen Brewer
 2004: Owly: The Way Home, by Andy Runton
 2005: The Lone and Level Sands, by A. David Lewis and mpMann (a.k.a. Marvin Perry Mann)
 2006: Chemistry-Comic & CD Soundtrack, by Steve Peters
 2007: Mr. Big, by Matt & Carol Dembicki
 2008: A Thorn in the Side, by Bill Knapp

Award categories

General 
 2009: The Dreamer #1–5, by Lora Innes
 2010: (tie)
 Cragmore Book One, by Pat N. Lewis 
 Mirror Mind, by Tory Woollcott
 2011: The Collected Diabetes Funnies, by Colin Upton
 2012: (tie)
 Kiss & Tell: A Romantic Resumé, Ages 0 to 22, by Mari Naomi
 No One is Safe, by Katherine Wirick
 2013: Ragged Rider: Tales of a Cowboy Mummy, by Andrew Meyerhoefer
 2014: Black of Heart, written by Chris Charlton, illustrated by David Hollenbach
 2015: If the Shoe Fits, written by Emily Willis, illustrated by Ann Uland
 2016: Woodstalk #6 (According to Plan), by Bruce Worden
 2017: Refugee Road (Prince Delight), written by Stu Rase & Tara Rase-Writers, illustrated by Will Jones
 2018: Himawari Share Vol. 1 & 2, by Harmony Becker

Graphic novel 
 2013: Xoc: The Journey of a Great White, by Matt Dembicki
 2014: Persia Blues, written by Dara Naraghi, illustrated by Brent Bowman
 2015: Apama: The Undiscovered Animal (Hero Tomorrow Comics), written by Ted Sikora & Millo Miller, illustrated by Benito Gallego
 2016: Persia Blues Vol. 2: Love & War (NBM), written by Dara Naraghi, illustrated by Brent Bowman
 2017: Black of Heart (Narrier), written by Chris Charlton, illustrated by David Hollenbach
 2018: Far Tune – Autumn, written by Terry Eisele, illustrated by Brent Bowman

Minicomic/Short story 
 2009: Aliens  Poop on Your Children, by Chris Garrett
 2010: Board of Superheroes #2, by Matt Feazell
 2011: Sing, Sing, by Paul Zdepski
 2012: And Then One Day #9, by Ryan Claytor
 2013: Better Together, by Ryan Claytor
 2014: (tie)
  Birds in a Sluddle, by Pam Bliss 
 Blindspot #3, by Joseph Remnant
 Limp Wrist, written by Scout Wolfcave, illustrated by Penina Gal
 2015:  Bad Sex, by Lauren McCallister
 2016:  (tie)
 Dive, by Sean Dempsey
 Far Tune, written by Terry Eisele, illustrated by Brent Bowman-Writer
 2017: Brain Weather (Anxious Ink LLC), by Alexis Cooke
 2018: Anemone & Catharus, by Harmony Becker

Webcomic 
 2009: Introspective Comics, by Ryan Dow
 2010: Champ 2010, by Jed Collins
 2011: Spoilers, by Kevin Czapiewski
 2012: Next Year’s Girl, by Katie Valeska
 2013: Little Guardians, by Lee Cherolis and Ed Cho
 2014: Black Rose, by Aaron Minier, Christopher Atudt, and Brandon Peat
 2015: (tie)
 Clattertron.com, by Daniel J. Hogan
 Wonder Care: After School (Vantage: Inhouse Productions), written by Justin Castaneda & Victor Dandridge, illustrated by Justin Castaneda

Junior Category 
 2016:
 Ant and the Zombie Spiders Parts 1 & 2, by Harrison Worden
 Starcatcher’s Quest, by Althea Seilhan
 2017:
 Daughter of Brothers & Daughters (Silber), written by Brian John Mitchell & J. M. Hunter, illustrated by Aubrey Hunter
 The Electric Team Food Adventure, by Abigail Connor
 The Mule Man Collection, by Max Wolf & Amelia Sealy
 2018:
 Be Your Self, by Aubrey Hunter
 Duncleosteous, by Nevan Bowman
 Kitchen Chemistry for Kids of All Ages, written by Matt Williams, illustrated by Althea Seilhan
 Pirate’s Life, by Aubrey Hunter
 Puppy Dog Tales, by Althea Seilhan
 Sylvester (Dimestore), by Lucian Snars
 Super Tooth (Zimberack Comics), by Jackson Connor
 Swann Castle, by Abigail Connor
 There Was an Accident... (Silber), written by Violet Mitchell, illustrated by Nate McDonough, Jason Young, Eric Shonborn, Kurt Dinse, Chelsea Fields, Jared Catherine, and Shane DeLeon
 We Only Live Once, by Aubrey Hunter

See also 
 Alternative Press Expo
 MoCCA Festival
 Small Press Expo
 STAPLE!

References

External links
 

Comics conventions in the United States
Recurring events established in 2000
Conventions in Ohio
Comics awards